was a Japanese photographer.  In 2019, Fujifilm Square in Tokyo sponsored a Photo History Museum Exhibition on his work and legacy, entitled, "The Story of Seibei Kajima, the 'Millionaire Photographer' in the Meiji Period."  This exhibit presented Kajima as a trailblazer in Japanese portrait and landscape photography, who developed new techniques, for example, by devising large-format cameras to take oversized photographs, by experimenting with X-rays, and by employing the magnesium flash to take photographs at night.

Gallery

References

Japanese photographers
1866 births
1924 deaths
Culture articles needing translation from Japanese Wikipedia